The Central Revolutionary Committee (CRC) was a French Blanquist political party founded in 1881 and dissolved in 1898.

The CRC was founded by Édouard Vaillant to continue the political struggle of Auguste Blanqui (1805–1881). It was weakened by a split in 1888, when numerous members including Henri Rochefort followed General Georges Ernest Boulanger who synthesized Jacobin nationalism with socialism and many saw Boulangism as a possible way to socialism. Following the Boulangist dissidence, Vaillant re-centered the party around the idea of syndicalism and strike. The CRC was further reinforced in 1896 by the affiliation of the Revolutionary Communist Alliance (ACR), formed by dissidents of the Revolutionary Socialist Workers' Party (POSR).

The CRC was dissolved into the Socialist Revolutionary Party in 1898.

Notable members 
 Édouard Vaillant

See also
History of the Left in France
Socialist Revolutionary Party

1881 establishments in France
1898 disestablishments in France
Defunct political parties in France
Defunct socialist parties in Europe
History of socialism
Political parties disestablished in 1898
Political parties established in 1881
Political parties of the French Third Republic
Second International
Socialist parties in France